The ceremonial county of Tyne and Wear is divided into 12 parliamentary constituencies. They are all borough constituencies. As of the 2019 general election, all are represented by the Labour Party (UK), the only county in the United Kingdom where this is the case.

Constituencies

2010 boundary changes
Under the Fifth Periodic Review of Westminster constituencies, the Boundary Commission for England decided to reduce the number of seats in Tyne and Wear from 13 to 12, leading to significant changes. The constituencies of Gateshead East and Washington West, Houghton and Washington East, Sunderland North, Sunderland South, and Tyne Bridge were abolished and replaced with Gateshead, Houghton and Sunderland South, Sunderland Central, and Washington and Sunderland West. Newcastle upon Tyne East and Wallsend became Newcastle upon Tyne East.

Proposed boundary changes 
See 2023 Periodic Review of Westminster constituencies for further details.

Following the abandonment of the Sixth Periodic Review (the 2018 review), the Boundary Commission for England formally launched the 2023 Review on 5 January 2021. Initial proposals were published on 8 June 2021 and, following two periods of public consultation, revised proposals were published on 8 November 2022. Final proposals will be published by 1 July 2023.

The commission has proposed that Newcastle upon Tyne and North Tyneside be combined with Northumberland as a sub-region of the North East Region, with the creation of two cross-county boundary constituencies comprising an expanded Hexham seat and a new seat named Cramlington and Killingworth. Gateshead, South Tyneside and Sunderland would be combined with County Durham, resulting in another cross-county boundary constituency, named Blaydon and Consett. The constituencies of Blaydon, Gateshead, North Tyneside, Newcastle upon Tyne Central, Newcastle upon Tyne East, and Washington and Sunderland West would be abolished, and new or re-established constituencies of Gateshead and Whickham, Newcastle upon Tyne Central and West, Newcastle upon Tyne East and Wallsend, and Washington created. The following seats are proposed:

Containing electoral wards from Gateshead
Blaydon and Consett (part)
Gateshead and Whickham
Jarrow (part)
Washington (part)
Containing electoral wards from Newcastle upon Tyne

 Cramlington and Killingworth (parts also in North Tyneside and Northumberland)

Hexham (part also in Northumberland)
Newcastle upon Tyne Central and West
Newcastle upon Tyne East and Wallsend (part)
Newcastle upon Tyne North (part)
Containing electoral wards from North Tyneside

 Cramlington and Killingworth (parts also in Newcastle upon Tyne and Northumberland)

 Newcastle upon Tyne East and Wallsend (part)

Newcastle upon Tyne North (part)
Tynemouth
Containing electoral wards from South Tyneside
Jarrow (part)
South Shields
Containing electoral wards from Sunderland
Houghton and Sunderland South
Sunderland Central
Washington (part)

Results history
Primary data source: House of Commons research briefing - General election results from 1918 to 2019

2019 
The number of votes cast for each political party who fielded candidates in constituencies comprising Tyne and Wear in the 2019 general election were as follows:

Percentage votes 

11983 & 1987 - Alliance

* Included in Other

Seats

Maps

Historical representation by party

See also
 List of parliamentary constituencies in the North East (region)
 History of parliamentary constituencies and boundaries in Tyne and Wear

Notes

References

Tyne and Wear
Politics of Tyne and Wear
 
Parliamentary constituencies